Khanum Singh (nee Haji) (Hindi: ख़ानम हाजी, Urdu: خانم حاجی) was an Indian tennis player from Hyderabad. She was the women's four time champion at the National Lawn Tennis Championships of India from 1947 to 1949, and 1957.

Career
Singh a four time winer of the National Lawn Tennis Championships of India (1947-49, 1957). In 1957 she also won the Northern India Championships in New Delhi defeating  Mrs. J.B. Singh 4-6 7-5 6-1. She won Southern India Championships held at Madras also in 1957 against Mrs Sarah Mody, and defeated her again in the same year at the Western India Championships held in Bombay.

Career finals

Singles (8–0)

References 

Indian female tennis players
Sportswomen from Hyderabad, India
Year of birth missing (living people)
Living people
20th-century Indian women
20th-century Indian people
Racket sportspeople from Hyderabad, India